Haut-Languedoc Regional Nature Park is a regional natural park in the south of the Massif Central within the Aveyron, Hérault, and Tarn departments of France. These areas are considered the Haut-Languedoc, compared to the Bas-Languedoc.

Administered by the Federation of French Regional Nature Parks, it was created on 22 October 1973 and revised on 17 August 1999.  It has an area of 2,605 km2, with 82,000 people living within its boundaries.

The park (coordinates 43.52898, 2.6984) comprises a very diverse range of landscapes, which is why seven different areas have been officially defined within it:

 Caroux-Espinouse
 Montagne noire
 Monts de Lacaune
 Monts d'Orb
 Plateau des Lacs
 Sidobre
 Vignes et Vallées

The park provides a habitat for more than 240 species of birds, in a stunningly diverse range of climate and scenery.  It also provides a home for mouflons, successfully reintroduced from Corsica.

External links

 Official website 

Haut-Languedoc
Geography of Aveyron
Geography of Hérault
Geography of Tarn (department)
Protected areas established in 1973
Tourist attractions in Occitania (administrative region)
Tourist attractions in Aveyron
Tourist attractions in Hérault
Tourist attractions in Tarn (department)